Fracture is the fifth studio album by Scottish metalcore band Bleed from Within. It was released on 29 May 2020 through Century Media Records. Metal Hammer named it as the 40th best metal album of 2020.

Track listing

Personnel
Bleed from Within
 Scott Kennedy – unclean vocals
 Ali Richardson – drums, percussion
 Craig "Goonzi" Gowans – lead guitar
 Davie Provan – bass
 Steven Jones – rhythm guitar, clean vocals

Additional musician
 Matt Heafy – guitar solo 

Production and design
 Bleed from Within – production
 Adam "Nolly" Getgood – engineering , mixing
 Steven Jones – engineering 
 Ermin Hamidovic – mastering
 David Provan – artwork
 Simon A Visuals – layout

Charts

References

2020 albums
Bleed from Within albums
Century Media Records albums